Desert Blume is a hamlet in southern Alberta, Canada within Cypress County, adjacent to the southern boundary of Medicine Hat.  

Demographics 

See also 
List of communities in Alberta
List of hamlets in Alberta

References 

Cypress County
Designated places in Alberta
Hamlets in Alberta